Erhard Mauersberger (29 December 1903 in Mauersberg, Saxony – 11 December 1982 in Leipzig) was a German choral conductor who conducted the Thomanerchor as the 14th Thomaskantor since Johann Sebastian Bach. He was also an academic teacher and composer.

Biography 
Mauersberger, the son of a cantor in Mauersberg, Saxony, was the younger brother of Rudolf Mauersberger, who was cantor of the Dresdner Kreuzchor. He was a Thomaner (a member of the Thomanerchor) from 1914 to 1920 under Gustav Schreck. He studied the organ with Karl Straube at the Leipziger Konservatorium.

In 1925 he became director of the Aachener Bachverein, and in 1928 became a teacher at the Mainz Conservatory and a cantor at the Christuskirche in Mainz. From 1930 he was cantor at the Georgenkirche in Eisenach. In 1932 he started teaching at the Hochschule für Musik "Franz Liszt", Weimar, and was appointed professor for choral conducting in 1946. In autumn 1933 he joined the German Christians. From 1939 on, he worked in their Institute for the Study and Elimination of Jewish Influence on German Church Life and was the musical editor of their "de-Judaized" hymnal, Grosser Gott, wir loben Dich. Beginning in 1950, he directed the Thüringer Kirchenmusikhochschule in Eisenach.

From 1961 to 1972 he was Thomaskantor, succeeding Kurt Thomas. With his brother, he conducted Bach's St Matthew Passion in a recording with Peter Schreier as the Evangelist, Theo Adam as the Vox Christi (voice of Jesus), Adele Stolte, Annelies Burmeister, Hans-Joachim Rotzsch and Günther Leib.

He composed works a cappella in late romantic style for the choir.

References

External links
 
 Erhard Mauersberger on Leipzig-Lexikon (in German)
 Entries for Erhard Mauersberger on WorldCat

1903 births
1982 deaths
People from Erzgebirgskreis
People from the Kingdom of Saxony
German Lutherans
German choral conductors
German male conductors (music)
Thomaskantors
20th-century German conductors (music)
20th-century composers
Recipients of the Patriotic Order of Merit in gold
Academic staff of the Hochschule für Musik Franz Liszt, Weimar
20th-century German male musicians
20th-century Lutherans